Hello Janine! is a 1939 German musical film directed by Carl Boese and starring Marika Rökk, Johannes Heesters and Rudi Godden. Along with Der Bettelstudent (1936) and Gasparone (1937) it helped establish Rökk as a major star, an effective replacement for La Jana.

Cast
 Marika Rökk - Janine
 Johannes Heesters - Count Rene
 Rudi Godden - Pierre Tarin
 Mady Rahl - Bibi
 Else Elster - Yvette
 Erich Ponto - Monsieur Pamion
 Kate Kühl - Madame Pamion
 Hubert von Meyerinck - Jean
 Ernst Dumcke - The Director
 Edith Meinhard - Charlotte
 Marjan Lex - Bourboule
 Marlise Ludwig - The Hostess

References

Bibliography

External links

1939 films
1939 musical comedy films
German musical comedy films
Films of Nazi Germany
1930s German-language films
Films directed by Carl Boese
Films with screenplays by Karl Georg Külb
Films set in Paris
German black-and-white films
UFA GmbH films
1930s German films